Gone West was an American country pop group composed of Colbie Caillat, Justin Young, Jason Reeves, and Nelly Joy. They made their debut as a band on the Grand Ole Opry stage and signed with Triple Tigers. The band released their debut and only album, Canyons, on June 12, 2020.

Background
Gone West was formed in 2018 and is composed of Colbie Caillat, Justin Kawika Young, Nelly Joy, and her husband Jason Reeves, and was formed following the four touring together in support of Caillat's The Malibu Sessions. The band is based out of Nashville, Tennessee, and gets its name from the fact that its four members all hail from states (Reeves from Iowa, Joy from Texas, Caillat from California, and Young from Hawaii) west of Tennessee, which was the inspiration for the band's "autobiographical theme song" and titular track "Gone West." All of its members had previous experience in the music industry as recording artists and songwriters: Caillat as a Grammy-winning folk pop artist, Young as an artist in the contemporary Hawaiian music scene, Reeves as a songwriter of some of Caillat's biggest hits and an indie artist, and Nelly Joy as one half of country duo the JaneDear girls.

The EP, Tides, was released on January 18, 2019. It reached No. 7 on Billboards Heatseekers Albums chart, No. 17 on Country Albums Sales, and No. 74 on the Top Current Albums chart.

"What Could've Been" was released to country radio on July 15, 2019, as the band's debut single and the lead-off single to their debut studio album, Canyons, which was a top 30 hit on the Country Airplay chart in 2020. Writing for Nashville Lifestyles Magazine, music critic Luke Levenson praised "What Could've Been," saying it "is a crisp yet plaintive ballad, with vocals which stand out and blend together naturally." Canyons, Gone West's debut album, was released on June 12, 2020.

On August 12, 2020, following the split between Caillat and Young, it was announced via social media that the group had disbanded.

Discography

Studio albums

Extended plays

Notes

Singles

Promotional singles

Music videos

References

Country music groups from Tennessee
Musical groups established in 2018
Colbie Caillat
Thirty Tigers artists
Musical groups disestablished in 2020
2018 establishments in the United States